Events in the year 1827 in Art.

Events
 Sir Richard Westmacott becomes Professor of Sculpture at the Royal Academy.
 John James Audubon begins publication of The Birds of America in the United Kingdom. Much of the background botanical artwork is by Joseph Mason.
 English painter Benjamin Haydon is committed to debtors' prison in London; while there he witnesses the mock election in the King's Bench Prison and records it in the paintings The Mock Election and Chairing the Member.
Charles Codman is discovered by art critic and patron John Neal.

Works

 William Blake – The Wood of the Self-Murderers: The Harpies and the Suicides
 Karl Briullov – Italian Midday
 Thomas Campbell
 Bust of Henry Raeburn
 Monument to the Duchess of Buccleuch in St Edmund's church, Warkton (England)
 George Catlin – Bird's Eye View of Niagara Falls
 Thomas Cole – Autumn in the Catskills
 Eugène Delacroix
 Combat of the Giaour and the Pasha
 Death of Sardanapalus
 Jean-François Garneray – The grand Dauphin visits a hut, led by the Duc de Montausier
 François Gérard - Coronation of Charles X of France
 Francisco Goya (attributed) – The Milkmaid of Bordeaux
 Hokusai – wood-block print series (1827–1830)
 A Tour of the Waterfalls of the Provinces
 Unusual Views of Celebrated Bridges in the Provinces
 Jean Auguste Dominique Ingres – The Apotheosis of Homer
 Orest Kiprensky – Portrait of Alexander Pushkin
 François Rude – Mercury fastening his sandals after having killed Argos (model for bronze casting)
 John Simpson – The Captive Slave

Births
 February 13 – Frederick Daniel Hardy, English genre painter and member of the Cranbrook Colony (died 1911)
 April 2 – William Holman Hunt, English pre-Raphaelite painter (died 1910)
 May 1
 Agnes Börjesson, Swedish painter (died 1900)
 August Cappelen, Norwegian painter (died 1852)
 May 11 – Jean-Baptiste Carpeaux, French painter and sculptor (died 1875)
 June 21 – Vincenzo Cabianca, Italian painter (died 1902)
 October 19 – Charles Cordier, French sculptor (died 1905)
 Thomas Farrell, Irish sculptor (died 1900)
 Emma Schenson, Swedish photographer (died 1913)

Deaths
 February 22 – Charles Willson Peale, American painter (born 1741)
 April 21 – Thomas Rowlandson, English artist and caricaturist (born 1757)
 May 6 – François-Frédéric Lemot, French sculptor (born 1772)
 August 12 – William Blake, English painter, poet and engraver (born 1757)
 December 23 – John Higton, English painter primarily of animals (born 1776)
 date unknown
 Pierre-Antoine Bellangé, French ébéniste (born 1757)
 Féréol Bonnemaison, French portrait painter and lithographer
 Allen Robert Branston, English wood-engraver (born 1778)

References

 
Years of the 19th century in art
1820s in art